Gabriela Chlumecká is a Czech former football striker. She played for Sparta Prague and Slavia Prague, taking part in the UEFA Women's Cup with both teams.

She was an international for 17 years, representing both Czechoslovakia and the Czech Republic. She is the latter's top scorer with 52 goals in 66 appearances.

References

1975 births
Living people
Czech women's footballers
Czech Republic women's international footballers
Women's association football forwards
SK Slavia Praha (women) players
AC Sparta Praha (women) players
Czech Women's First League players